In bioinformatics, the Ciliate MDS/IES database is a biological database of spirotrich genes.

See also
 Spirotrich

References

External links
 http://oxytricha.princeton.edu/dimorphism/database.htm.

Biological databases
Spirotrichea